Wilska is a surname. Notable people with the surname include:

 (1911–1987), Finnish physicist and inventor
Kimmo Wilska (born 1956), Finnish newscaster
Tapio Wilska (born 1969), Finnish singer